Coleophora ornatipennella is a small moth of the family Coleophoridae.

Distribution
It is found in central and south-eastern Europe (from Germany and Poland to the Pyrenees, Italy and Greece and from France to Romania as well as in southern and northern Russia and Estonia) and in the Near East. It is also found in China.

Description
Forewings are yellowish and apically falcate, with dark gray stripes.

Behavior
The moth flies in May and June depending on the location. The larvae feed on Alopecurus, Anthoxanthum, Avena, Briza, Bromus, Dactylis glomerata, Holcus, Koeleria and Poa species. Young larvae feed on the developing receptacles of Lamiaceae species and use them also to make their first case. Before hibernation, they switch to mining grass blades. They make another case. Initially, the colour is yellowish white, but it quickly turns brownish. Larvae can be found from October to May.

Gallery

References

External links

Lepiforum.de

ornatipennella
Moths described in 1796
Moths of Europe
Moths of Asia